Foreign relations of the Donetsk People's Republic may refer to:

 Donetsk People's Republic–Russia relations
 Donetsk People's Republic–South Ossetia relations

Bilateral relations of the Donetsk People's Republic